This was the first edition of the tournament.

Shinobu Asagoe and Gisela Dulko won the title by defeating Conchita Martínez and Virginia Ruano Pascual 6–1, 7–5 in the final.

Seeds

Draw

Draw

References
 Tournament Profile (ITF)
 Main and Qualifying Draws (WTA)

Doubles
PTT Bangkok Open - Doubles
 in women's tennis